Dinh Xuan Luu is a Vietnamese Ambassador, he was the Ambassador to Poland of the Socialist Republic of Vietnam in the early 2000s. From 2009 he was an ambassador in Israel. He is married to Truong Phuong Hong.

Ambassador to Israel
Luu is today the Ambassador to Israel of the Socialist Republic of Vietnam.  He presented his credentials to Israeli President Shimon Peres as the first Vietnamese Ambassador to Israel on July 8, 2009.  Diplomatic relations had been established between the two countries in 1993. The Vietnam Embassy in Israel, where he is based, is at 4 Weizman Street in Tel Aviv.

In September 2011, he and Vietnamese Ministry of Defence Deputy Minister Lieutenant General Truong Quang Khanh led a working delegation from the defense ministry in a visit to Israel.

In September 2012, Luu said that friendship and cooperation between Israel and Vietnam had its roots in a meeting in 1946 between Democratic Republic of Vietnam Prime Minister and President Ho Chi Minh and David Ben-Gurion.  He also said that trade between the two countries had risen to $660 million in the first eight months of 2012.  He spoke of cooperation between the two countries in agriculture, water technologies, IT, telecommunication, education, and homeland security.

See also
Israel–Vietnam relations

References

External links
  Vietnamese embassy in Tel Aviv

Ambassadors of Vietnam to Israel
Ambassadors of Vietnam to Poland
Year of birth missing (living people)
Living people
Place of birth missing (living people)